Cynwyl Gaeo is an electoral ward, representing the communities of Cynwyl Gaeo, Llansawel and Llanycrwys, Carmarthenshire, Wales.

Profile
In 2014, the Cynwyl Gaeo electoral ward had an electorate of 1,323. The total population was 1,630, of whom 54.5% were born in Wales. The 2011 census indicated that 46.7% of the population were able to speak Welsh.

Current Representation
Cynwyl Gaeo is a single-member ward for the purposes of Carmarthenshire County Council elections. Since 1999 it has been represented by Plaid Cymru councillor Eirwyn Williams.

External links

References

Carmarthenshire electoral wards